Stuart Duncan (born 1964) is an American bluegrass musician.

Stewart or Stuart Duncan may also refer to:
 Stewart Duncan (philosopher), American philosopher
 Stewart Duncan (footballer) (born 1940), Australian rules footballer
 Stuart Duncan (cricketer) (1906–1971), New Zealand cricketer
 Stuart Kyle Duncan, an American judge

See also
Duncan Stewart (disambiguation)